The 2018 Liga 2 Final was the final match of the 2018 Liga 2, the ninth season of second-tier competition in Indonesia organised by PT Liga Indonesia Baru, and the second season since it was renamed from the Liga Indonesia Premier Division to the Liga 2. It was played at the Pakansari Stadium in Cibinong, Bogor, West Java on 4 December 2018.

PSS won the match 2–0 to secure their first title in this competition.

Road to the final

Note: In all results below, the score of the finalist is given first (H: home; A: away).

Match

Details

Statistics

References

Liga 2
2018